Milan Bjelica (born in 1956) is a former Deputy Chief of Serbian General Staff of the Serbian Armed Forces. He is married, father of two children, Maja and Marija.

Education

 School of National Defence, 2001
 Staff Command College, 1995
 Military Academy, 1979
 Military Grammar School, 1975

Previous positions

 Chief of Cabinet of Minister of Defence
 Chief of Division in Department for Operations, General Staff
 Chief of Division in  Sector for Operational and Staff Affairs, General Staff
 Chief of Section in Sector for Operational and Staff Affairs, General Staff
 Independent Officer for Organizational Development of the Infantry
 Battalion Commander
 Professor of Tactics
 Company Commander
 Platoon Commander

Promotions

 Major General, 2011
 Brigadier General, 2008
 Colonel, 1999
 Lt. Colonel, 1995
 Major, 1991
 Captain First Class, 1987
 Captain, 1983
 Lieutenant, 1980
 Second Lieutenant, 1979

Medals

 Medal of Bravery
 Order of Merit of the Defence and Security
 Order of Military Merit
 Military Commemorative Medal

References

See also
 Biography on official Serbian Armed Forces website
 Military of Serbia
 Serbian General Staff

1956 births
Living people
Serbian military leaders
Recipients of the Medal for Bravery (Serbia)